Megacraspedus albovenata is a moth of the family Gelechiidae. It is found in the southern Urals (the Orenburg area), the Czech Republic and Slovakia. The habitat consists of grassy steppe.

References

Moths described in 2010
Megacraspedus